Ironville in Derbyshire, England, was built about 1830 by the Butterley Company as a model village to house its workers. The population of the civil parish was 1,930 at the 2021 Census.  It is situated between Riddings and Codnor Park.

John Wright and William Jessop had purchased the land adjacent to the Cromford Canal from Lancelot Rolleston of Watnall in 1809.

The village was notable for its large gardens, and its rural setting. The Mechanics Institute was built in 1846; schools were provided in 1850 and a parish church in 1852.

The local authority modernised parts of the village in the late twentieth century.

Nearby is Pye Hill and the bend in the Cromford Canal where it turns southward down the Erewash Valley and the junction with its extension to Pinxton.

About a quarter of a mile north east is another transport landmark, Pye Bridge at the junction of the Erewash Valley railway line and the extension to Ambergate. Part of the line to Ambergate is now preserved as Midland Railway - Butterley, which terminates just south of the former Pye Bridge Station.

The History of Ironville in a “nutshell”
Ironville is possibly Derbyshire’s best example of a mid-nineteenth century model village. The village itself was mainly created between 1834 and 1860 by the Butterley Company to house its iron workers. The model village won much national acclaim, with its large gardens, a rural setting well away from the ironworks and the overall spacious layout compared with other industrial villages. The physical and spiritual welfare of the employees of the Company was reflected not only in the provision of a church and a school by the Company, but also with the provision of a complete range of public services for the village. These included its own gas and water works, a Mechanics' Institute containing an artisans' library and swimming bath. Nearby, but still within the parish of Ironville is Codnor Park formally an ancient Deer Park. At the historically renowned Codnor Park Iron Works (demolished in the 1970’s and now landscaped and planted with native trees), cannonballs were made for Waterloo, armour plate was made for the very first iron-hulled warships such as The Warrior & The Black Prince (circa 1861). During World War II the works also produced sterns for 57 “Loch” class frigates, and 51 large bridges, each with a 150-foot span, which were used for crossing the Rhine and Italian rivers. In addition, the company manufactured tracks for Churchill and Cromwell tanks as well as many other important products for the war effort.

The first houses in Ironville actually built by the Butterley Company in 1802 for workers at the newly built Lime Works. The row of houses was originally called Measham Row (later Lime Kiln Row) and probably reflects where these workers came from. They would all have walked there or hitched a ride on barges passing along the canal system. This would also apply to all the workers who came to live there in the period 1834 to 1860. Many walked from Wales just to be employed there, not being able to afford train fares etc. Just imagine - a house and a job! They must have thought they were dreaming or heading for the land of plenty!

Just imagine what it was like to live in Ironville 100 years ago. A flourishing community:
The ironworks a part of the famous Butterley Company. During the 19th century the Company became a thriving success. In 1862 there were seven furnaces at Butterley and Ironville which produced one-fifth of the total output of iron in Derbyshire. Later in the 19th century the production of ironstone declined locally, but the Company still remained a major force in the iron industry. It was heavily involved in the expansion of the railway industry, by the manufacture of track and wagons at its foundry and engineering works, and the Butterley Company was famously used for the huge arched roof of St Pancras Station in London, one of the wonders of Victorian engineering. Throughout its history the Company was heavily involved with the production of bridges, heavy structural steelwork, mining equipment and machinery, presses, castings and overhead cranes.
The development of ironville is due to the formation of the Butterley Company and the opening of the Cromford Canal.
Before the Ironville iron works had been constructed, coal and iron stone had been mined in the area for hundreds of years. Records go back to the De Grey family having coal mines in the area in the fifteenth century. In 1599 Thomas Shorter married Elizabeth Bradway, in Heanor Parish Church. Thomas’s address was given as living “at Ironville by the Furnace.” Before Ironville Parish Church was constructed Codnor Park was an 'extra parochial liberty' referring to the fact that the area did not at that time come under any parish. Couples in those days had to travel as far as Heanor, Eastwood and Alfreton to get married. Codnor Park was once part of the Manor and Castle of Codnor and was mentioned in Domesday Book.

Close to the village is one of only two medieval castles retaining its original medieval architecture in the whole of the county of Derbyshire, (the only other being Peveril Castle in the Peak District). Codnor Castle has a very rich history and the castle site dates back to the 11th century. The castle was the home and power base for one of medieval England’s most powerful families for 300 years - the De Grey family, also known as the Barons Grey of Codnor. This medieval fortress was once grand enough to play host to royal visits including that of King Edward II in 1342. The Castle is open to the Public every second Sunday of the month throughout the year.
When Channel 4’s Time Team visited they quite literally struck gold. Excavations at Codnor Castle in Derbyshire unearthed a gold coin which presenter Tony Robinson said was one of the most valuable single items ever found on Time Team. Their discoveries revealed far more than anyone ever expected. In the bottom of Codnor Castle’s moat they found a Gold Noble coin which dates back to the time of Henry V and the Battle of Agincourt. Their excavations also uncovered the remains of a massive round tower and one of the first drawbridges ever discovered in the programme’s 15 year history.
The village in the nineteenth century boasted its very own brewery, a pottery and a brick works. In the twentieth century there was for a time, an oil well producing 400 gallons of oil per day, (1921).

Near to the castle are two well-known local landmarks - the Jessop Memorial & Hall. The monument was built in 1854 by public subscription by Butterley workers as a monument to William Jessop II, son of the founder, who developed the company after the death of his father in 1814. The monument and grounds once upon a time proved to be a popular attraction for Galas, and Sunday school outings and picnics. Whit Monday Band of Hope Fetes were also held there, with local Bands marching through the villages before finally ending up at the monument. The Monument Hall in later years was used as a Rola-Rena.
The parishioners of Codnor Park and Ironville can claim to possess one of the most substantial and beautiful monuments to World War I in the county. The unveiling and dedication ceremony was held on 16 November 1923. The engraving and erection of the memorial was carried out by an ex-Service man, Mr. E. Cope, of Riddings. The foundation, which measures 8 feet by 7 feet 6 inches, was laid by the Butterley Company, also the paving from Christ Church’s gateway to the monument.

The village is set within excellent countryside surroundings with many wonderful signposted walks and benefits from being only ten minutes from the local town centres of Alfreton and Ripley.
Ironville Reservoir, built originally to top up the canal is a popular spot for walking and fishing, with good access for disabled anglers, also a haven for a variety of birdlife.
Less than two miles to the west of the reservoir is Swanwick Junction, part of the Midland Railway Trust which commemorates one of the major railway companies of its time. It has a superb collection of steam and diesel locomotives which may be seen powering trains on the line or on display in the museum. The Golden Valley Light Railway (GVLR) and Butterley Park Miniature Railway are based here too.

See also
LIsted buildings in Ironville
Listed buildings in Ironville and Riddings Ward

References

External links

 
 Photographic Gallery in "Genuki"
 http://unicorns.comli.com/Index.htm

Villages in Derbyshire
Civil parishes in Derbyshire
Geography of Amber Valley